Ole Gammelgaard Nielsen (born 20 November 1965) is a Danish archer. He competed at the 1988 Summer Olympics and the 1992 Summer Olympics.

References

External links
 

1965 births
Living people
Danish male archers
Olympic archers of Denmark
Archers at the 1988 Summer Olympics
Archers at the 1992 Summer Olympics
People from Silkeborg
Sportspeople from the Central Denmark Region
20th-century Danish people